This article details the filmography of actor and martial artist Bruce Lee.

Several of Lee's films premiered after his death, including Enter the Dragon, Game of Death and Circle of Iron.

Feature films

Released posthumously

Box office performance

Television appearances

Note: all the series produced after Lee's death (1973) feature archival footage of Lee.

Documentaries

Note: all the documentaries listed here were produced after Lee's death; therefore, all the Lee footage is composed of archive footage and some never-before-seen footage.

Video games

Note 1: In Super Mario RPG, when Mario is about to fight a boss, his comrade Mallow stops him and says "Who do you think you are? Bruce Lee? You can't go in there with your fists flying!"

Note 2: Check Kim Dragon in World Heroes (1992), World Heroes 2 (1993), World Heroes Jet (1994) and World Heroes Perfect (1995).

Note 3: Check Marshall Law in Tekken (1994), Tekken 2 (1995), Tekken 3 (1996), Tekken 4 (2002), Tekken 5 (2005), Tekken 6 (2007) and Tekken 7 (2016) as well as Forest Law in Tekken Tag Tournament (1999), Marshall Law and Forest Law in Tekken Tag Tournament 2 (2011).

Music videos

Bruceploitation films

The Pig Boss (1972)
Shadow of the Dragon (1973)
The Game of Death! (1974)
Bruce Lee: A Dragon Story (1974)
 Bruce Lee, D-Day at Macao (1975)
Goodbye Bruce Lee: His Last Game of Death (1975)
 Bruce Lee Against Supermen (1975)
Exit the Dragon, Enter the Tiger (1976)
 Enter the Panther (1976)
Bruce Lee Fights Back from the Grave (1976)
New Fist of Fury (1976)
The Dragon Lives (1976)
Bruce Lee: The Man, The Myth (1976)
 Bruce's Deadly Fingers (1976)
 The Big Boss Part II (1976)
 Bruce and Shaolin Kung Fu (1977)
 Bruce and the Shaolin Bronzemen (1977)
 Bruce Lee's Ways of Kung Fu (1977)
 Return of Bruce (1977)
The Dragon Lives Again (1977)
 Bruce Lee the Invincible (1977)
 Bruce Lee, We Miss You (1977) 
Fist of Fury II (1977)
 Bruce Li in New Guinea (1977)
 Deadly Strike (1978) 
 Bruce Li's Magnum Fist (1978)
 Bruce Lee vs. the Iron Dragon (1978)
Return of the Tiger (1978)
The Image of Bruce Lee (1978)
Fists of Bruce Lee (1978)
Enter the Game of Death (1978)
 Enter Three Dragons (1978)
Enter the Fat Dragon (1978)
 Return of the Fist of Fury (1978)
 Soul Brothers of Kung Fu (1978)
 The Image of Bruce Lee (1978) 
 Edge of Fury (1978)
 My Name Called Bruce (1978)
 Way of the Dragon 2 (1978)
 Bruce and Shaolin Kung Fu 2 (1978)
 Bruce the Super Hero (1979)
 Bruce Lee's Secret (1979)
 Re-Enter the Dragon (1979)
Fist of Fury III (1979)
They Call Him Bruce Lee (1979)
Kungfu Fever (1979)
 The True Game of Death (1979)
 Bruce Against Iron Hand (1979)
 The Iron Dragon Strikes Back (1979)
 Blind Fist of Bruce (1979)
Fist of Fear, Touch of Death (1980)
Bruce's Fist of Vengeance (1980)
 The Clones of Bruce Lee (1980)
 Treasure of Bruce Le (1980)
 Bruce, King of Kung Fu (1980)
 Challenge of the Tiger (1980)
 Enter Another Dragon (1981)
 Bruce vs. Bill (1981)
 Bruce and the Dragon Fist (1981)
 Force: Five (1981)
They Call Me Bruce? (1982)
 Ninja Strikes Back (1982)
 Bruce Le vs. Ninja (1982)
Jackie and Bruce to the Rescue (1982)
 Cameroon Connection (1984)
 The Last Dragon (1985)
 No Retreat, No Surrender (1986)
 Return of the Kickfighter (1987)
 Ninja Over the Great Wall (1987)
 Bruce's Secret Kung Fu (1988)
 Fist of Legend (1994)
 Shaolin Soccer (2001)
 Finishing the Game (2007)
 Legend of the Fist: The Return of Chen Zhen (2010)
 Enter the Fat Dragon (2020)

See also
Bruceploitation
Bruce Lee Library
 Bruce Lee (comics) 
List of awards and honors received by Bruce Lee
Jeet Kune Do

Notes

References

External links
 
 Bruce Lee at Hong Kong Cinemagic
 

Filmography
 
Hong Kong filmographies